Northern Lake Munmorah Sand Dunes is a natural site in Northern Lake Munmorah, Australia.

The eight sand dunes were formed 40,000 years during huge sandstorms over many years. It is one of the biggest sand-dune sights in the Central Coast of New South Wales.

Aboriginal Australians lived in the dunes. and evidence of this can still be found today. 

The Munmorah Sand Dunes have been in Northern Lake Munmorah for nearly 40 thousand years. The eight sand-dunes were formed during huge sandstorms over many years. It is one of the biggest sand-dune sights in the Central Coast.

Names for Dunes
The Aboriginals had names for these dunes

References

Dunes of Australia